Dogwood Creek may refer to:

Dogwood Creek (Queensland), a stream in Queensland, Australia
Dogwood Creek (Little Indian Creek), a stream in the US states of Arkansas and Missouri